The Poland men's national under-21 volleyball team is controlled by the Polski Związek Piłki Siatkowej (PZPS), which represents the country in international competitions – U20 European Championships and U21 World Championship.

History
First massive success Polish junior national team was achieved by players born mostly in 1977 and 1978. The junior national team led by coach Ireneusz Mazur achieved titles of 1996 Junior European Champion and 1997 Junior World Champion successively in the tournaments held in Israel and Bahrain. Among the players of this team were several players who later achieved notable careers and many medals in domestic and international tournaments like for example Paweł Zagumny, Krzysztof Ignaczak, Sebastian Świderski, Piotr Gruszka.

In 2003 Polish junior national team was crowned as the 2003 Junior World Champion. The national team born in 1983–85, led by Grzegorz Ryś, beat Brazil in the finale after tie break. It was a second title of Junior World Champions for Poland. Among the players was a few later senior European and (or) World Champions like Michał Winiarski, Mariusz Wlazły, Marcin Możdżonek, Michał Ruciak, Paweł Woicki, Marcel Gromadowski.

On September 10, 2016 Poland U21 achieved title of the 2016 CEV U20 European Champion after winning 7 of 7 matches in tournament and beating Ukraine U21 in the finale (3–1). On July 2, 2017 Poland U21 achieved title of U21 World Champion 2017 after beating Cuba U21 in the finale (3–0). The same squad of national team, led by coach Sebastian Pawlik, won 48 matches in the row and never lost (counted also under-19 tournaments). The squad roster, consisting mainly of players from the year 1997, has won all possible European and World championships under-19 and under-21.

Statistics

U21 World Championship
 Champions   Runners up   Third place

U20 European Championship
 Champions   Runners up   Third place

References

External links
Official website

See also
 Poland men's national U19 volleyball team
 Poland men's national U23 volleyball team
 Poland men's national volleyball team

National men's under-21 volleyball teams
National team U21
National team U21
Men's sport in Poland
Youth sport in Poland